Bruce Edward Murray (born January 25, 1966) is an American former professional soccer player who at the time of his retirement was the all-time leading scorer for the U.S. National Team. His standout college career led to his selection by Soccer America Magazine to its College Team of the Century. He then played professionally in both Europe and the United States, including the American Soccer League and American Professional Soccer League. Concussion syndrome forced him to retire in 1995, Murray had earned 86 caps, scoring 21 goals, including one at the 1990 FIFA World Cup.  He was also a member of the U.S. national futsal team which placed third at the 1989 FIFA Futsal World Championship. Murray is the Direct of Coaching at Accelerator School DC Metro. He is a member of the National Soccer Hall of Fame.

Youth and college
Murray grew up in Maryland and attended Winston Churchill High School.  He played high school soccer at Churchill and club soccer with the Montgomery United Ponies, winning 2 National Championships with the Ponies coached by John Kerr Sr at the U-16 age group in 1981 and the U-19 age group in 1983.

After graduating from high school, Murray attended Clemson University, where he played as a forward on the men's soccer team from 1984 to 1987.  In his freshman year, the Tigers took the 1984 NCAA championship in a 2–1 victory over Indiana.  Through his four years at Clemson, Murray was a dominant forward, finishing his career as the first Clemson player to gain 40 goals and 40 assists.  His senior year, he again won the NCAA championship, this time a 2–0 victory over San Diego State.  On a personal level, he was named the 1987 Hermann Trophy winner and the 1987 ISAA Player of the Year.  He was also selected as a first team All-American as a forward.  This went with his selection as a 1985 All-American midfielder.  In 2000, SoccerAmerica named Murray to its College Team of the Century.  In 1993, Murray was elected to the Clemson University Hall of Fame.

Professional
In 1988, Murray signed with the Washington Stars of the American Soccer League (ASL).  This was the first year in existence for both the Stars and ASL.  The Stars finished third in the North Division with an 11–9 record and out of playoff contention.  He continued with the Stars for the next three seasons, but also spent time with Swiss club FC Luzern during the 1988–1989 winter (ASL offseason) season.  In 1990, the ASL merged with the Western Soccer League to form the American Professional Soccer League.  The Stars continued their poor run of play, finishing 7–13 and out of playoff contention yet again.  The team folded at the end of the 1990 and Murray moved to the Maryland Bays.  In 1991, Murray played nine games, scoring two goals, with the Bays.  By this time the APSL was collapsing and the Bays folded at the end of the season.

Murray took a break from full-time soccer when he signed a contract with the U.S. Soccer Federation (USSF) to play full-time with the U.S. national team.  On July 30, 1993, the U.S. Soccer Federation released Murray from his national team contract in order to allow him to pursue professional opportunities in Europe.  Murray then moved to England to pursue a contract with English Championship club Millwall.

On August 9, 1993, Murray signed with Millwall and scored six days later in his debut match when Millwall defeated Stoke City 2–1.  Despite this excellent start, Murray was limited to 12 games with concussion issues scoring three game winning goals against Stoke City, Watford and Nottingham Forest.  over the next year and Millwall released him on October 12, 1994.  During his time with Millwall, the team sent him on loan to Stockport County.

When Murray returned to the U.S., he signed with the Atlanta Ruckus of the A-League.  That season the Ruckus went to the championship before falling to the Seattle Sounders.  Having battled knee injuries/head injuries  for several years, Murray retired from playing professionally at the end of the 1995 season.

National team
Murray earned his first cap in a 5–0 defeat against England in Los Angeles, on June 16, 1985, while still in college. His first national team goal came against Uruguay on February 7, 1986. The game ended in a 1–1 tie. Murray went on to play on the U.S. team at the 1988 Summer Olympics, and become a mainstay in the lineup during World Cup qualifying.  Murray started all three games for the US at the 1990 FIFA World Cup, the U.S.'s first appearance at the Cup since 1950.  His play in the World Cup saw him having a hand in both goals scored during the finals, scoring one and assisting on the other.

Only Brian McBride, Clint Mathis, and John O'Brien have recorded a goal and an assist for the United States in one World Cup finals. Murray ended his national team career in 1993 with 86 caps and 22 goals. Murray holds the third most goals scored playing European teams with 9 goals, 2nd Landon Donovan (10) 1st Clint Dempsey (12).

Murray also played for the United States national futsal team which placed third at the 1989 FIFA Futsal World Championship.  He earned six caps and scored one goal with the futsal team.

U.S. National Team Appearances
As of match played June 22, 1993.

International goals

Post playing career
After a series of head injuries, Murray decided to retire from playing professionally.  At first, he entered the metals trading industry, but in 2001, he decided to re-enter soccer with the Atlanta Silverbacks youth program.

In 2002, Murray became the Director of coaching with the Roswell Soccer Club in Georgia.

On September 17, 2004, Harvard University announced that Murray had been hired as an assistant coach with the men's soccer team.  He was with Harvard for two seasons, then moved to the Capital Area Soccer League in Raleigh, NC where he was a staff coach.

On March 20, 2011, Murray was elected to the National Soccer Hall of Fame.

Recently Murray has been diagnosed with potential CTE symptoms from his concussion and repetitive heading of the ball over his playing career.

Murray currently is the color analyst for DC United Radio broadcasts and is
A television analyst during World Cup games

References

External links
 USSoccerPlayers.com bio
 
 

1966 births
Living people
All-American men's college soccer players
American expatriate soccer players
American expatriate sportspeople in England
American men's futsal players
American Professional Soccer League players
American soccer coaches
American soccer players
American Soccer League (1988–89) players
Association football forwards
Atlanta Silverbacks players
Ayr United F.C. players
Clemson Tigers men's soccer players
CONCACAF Gold Cup-winning players
FC Luzern players
Footballers at the 1988 Summer Olympics
Maryland Bays players
Millwall F.C. players
National Soccer Hall of Fame members
Olympic soccer players of the United States
Soccer players from Maryland
Stockport County F.C. players
United States men's international soccer players
Washington Stars players
1990 FIFA World Cup players
1991 CONCACAF Gold Cup players
1992 King Fahd Cup players
1993 Copa América players
People from Germantown, Maryland
Hermann Trophy men's winners
NCAA Division I Men's Soccer Tournament Most Outstanding Player winners